Ceriagrion corallinum is a species of damselfly in the family Coenagrionidae. It is found in Angola, Botswana, Cameroon, the Democratic Republic of the Congo, Ivory Coast, Ghana, Liberia, Namibia, Nigeria, Sierra Leone, Sudan, Uganda, Zambia, and possibly Malawi.

Its natural habitats are subtropical or tropical moist lowland forests, swamps, freshwater lakes, intermittent freshwater lakes, freshwater marshes, and intermittent freshwater marshes.

References

Coenagrionidae
Insects described in 1914
Taxonomy articles created by Polbot